Coleman Nee is an American public relations consultant and political figure who served as the Massachusetts Secretary of Veterans' Services from 2011 to 2015.

Nee worked in public policy advocacy and corporate communications for over 20 years. Among the companies Nee worked for were Bradlees, the Logan Airport Hilton Hotel and Towers, and Julie Country Day School.

From 1987 to 1993, Nee served as a member of the United States Marine Corps Reserve, rising to the rank of Corporal. He served during Operation Desert Storm.

In 2008 Nee was named Undersecretary of Veterans’ Services. In this role he oversaw the creation of the Statewide Advocacy for Veterans’ Empowerment (SAVE) program, which supports veterans and their families coping with the stresses of returning from war and assist them in obtaining veteran's benefits and services. He also helped obtain over $1 million in federal funds to train and find employment for veterans. Additionally, he led outreach efforts to homeless, women, and disabled veterans.

On January 21, 2011, he was named Secretary of Veterans’ Services, succeeding Medal of Honor recipient Thomas G. Kelley.

References

American public relations people
Living people
Massachusetts Democrats
People from Cohasset, Massachusetts
Massachusetts Secretaries of Veterans' Services
United States Marine Corps reservists
Year of birth missing (living people)